2019 Thailand Open may refer to:
2019 Thailand Open (tennis)
2019 Thailand Open (badminton)